Loco Luck is a 1927 American silent Western film directed by Clifford Smith and written by Doris Malloy and Isadore Bernstein. The film stars Art Acord, Fay Wray, Aggie Herring, William Steele, Al Jennings and George F. Marion. The film was released on January 23, 1927, by Universal Pictures.

Cast   
 Art Acord as Bud Harris
 Fay Wray as Molly Vernon
 Aggie Herring as Mrs. Vernon
 William Steele as Frank Lambert
 Al Jennings as Bush 
 George F. Marion as 'Dad' Perkins 
 M.E. Stimson as Mark Randall
 George Grandee as Jesse Turner
 Art Mix as Bush Henchman
 Buddy the Horse as Buddy

References

External links
 

1927 films
1927 Western (genre) films
Universal Pictures films
American black-and-white films
Films directed by Clifford Smith
Silent American Western (genre) films
1920s English-language films
1920s American films